Marcus Oliveira (born March 18, 1979) is a Menominee light heavyweight professional boxer fighting out of Lawrence, Kansas.

Professional career
Oliveira made his professional debut with a knockout win against Daniel Russell in April 2006. Oliveira would win his first six bouts by knockout, five of them in the first round.  In February 2007 Mike Word became the first opponent to last the distance with Oliveira. June 2007 saw Oliveira defeat an opponent with a winning record for the first time, as he defeated 179–18–2 Buck Smith by TKO in round 2.  Oliveira's first non-winning result was a split draw with 15–1–1 Nick Cook in February 2008, a fight for the vacant USBC light heavyweight title. Oliveira would take a major step forward with a dramatic come-from-behind win against undefeated prospect (8–0 with 8 knockouts) Phil Williams. In that fight Oliveira was knocked down twice but rallied to knock Williams out in the seventh round. In January 2009 Oliveira defeated veteran Rayco Saunders by majority decision. Oliveira defeated Otis Griffin by second-round knockout on June 5, 2009 at Grand Casino Hinckley in Minnesota.

Professional boxing record

{|class="wikitable" style="text-align:center"
|-
!
!Result
!Record
!Opponent 
!Type
!Round, time
!Date
!Location
!Notes
|-
|37
|Loss
|align=center|28–8–1
|align=left| Demetrius Banks
|
|
|
|align=left|
|
|-
|36
|Loss
|align=center|28–7–1
|align=left| Al Sands
|
|
|
|align=left|
|align=left|
|-
|35
|Loss
|align=center|28–6–1
|align=left| J'Leon Love
|
|
|
|align=left|
|align=left|
|-
|34
|Win
|align=center|28–5–1
|align=left| Dennis Morris
|
|
|
|align=left|
|
|-
|33
|Win
|align=center|27–5–1
|align=left| Justin Ridgway
|
|
|
|align=left|
|
|-
|32
|Loss
|align=center|26–5–1
|align=left| Frankie Lopez
|
|
|
|align=left|
|
|-
|31
|Loss
|align=center|26–4–1
|align=left| DeShon Webster
|
|
|
|align=left|
|align=left|
|-
|30
|Loss
|align=center|26–3–1
|align=left| Ramon Luis Nicolas
|
|
|
|align=left|
|
|-
|29
|Loss
|align=center|26–2–1
|align=left| Cornelius White
|
|
|
|align=left|
|
|-
|28
|Win
|align=center|26–1–1
|align=left| Dionisio Miranda
|
|
|
|align=left|
|
|-
|27
|Loss
|align=center|25–1–1
|align=left| Jürgen Brähmer
|
|
|
|align=left|
|
|-
|26
|Win
|align=center|25–0–1
|align=left| Ryan Coyne
|
|
|
|align=left|
|
|-
|25
|Win
|align=center|24–0–1
|align=left| Ricky Torrez
|
|
|
|align=left|
|
|-
|24
|Win
|align=center|23–0–1
|align=left| Antwun Echols
|
|
|
|align=left|
|
|-
|23
|Win
|align=center|22–0–1
|align=left| Chris Eppley
|
|
|
|align=left|
|
|-
|22
|Win
|align=center|21–0–1
|align=left| Demetrius Jenkins
|
|
|
|align=left|
|
|-
|21
|Win
|align=center|20–0–1
|align=left| James Morrow
|
|
|
|align=left|
|
|-
|20
|Win
|align=center|19–0–1
|align=left| Otis Griffin
|
|
|
|align=left|
|
|-
|19
|Win
|align=center|18–0–1
|align=left| Isaiah Henderson
|
|
|
|align=left|
|
|-
|18
|Win
|align=center|17–0–1
|align=left| Rayco Saunders
|
|
|
|align=left|
|
|-
|17
|Win
|align=center|16–0–1
|align=left| Kelvin Davis
|
|
|
|align=left|
|
|-
|16
|Win
|align=center|15–0–1
|align=left| Phil Williams
|
|
|
|align=left|
|
|-
|15
|Win
|align=center|14–0–1
|align=left| Leo Pla
|
|
|
|align=left|
|
|-
|14
|Win
|align=center|13–0–1
|align=left| Roy Hughes
|
|
|
|align=left|
|
|-
|13
|Draw
|align=center|12–0–1
|align=left| Nick Cook
|
|
|
|align=left|
|
|-
|12
|Win
|align=center|12–0
|align=left| Mike Word
|
|
|
|align=left|
|
|-
|11
|Win
|align=center|11–0
|align=left| Matt Gockel
|
|
|
|align=left|
|
|-
|10
|Win
|align=center|10–0
|align=left| Buck Smith
|
|
|
|align=left|
|
|-
|9
|Win
|align=center|9–0
|align=left| Rodney Moore
|
|
|
|align=left|
|
|-
|8
|Win
|align=center|8–0
|align=left| Leo Pla
|
|
|
|align=left|
|
|-
|7
|Win
|align=center|7–0
|align=left| Mike Word
|
|
|
|align=left|
|
|-
|6
|Win
|align=center|6–0
|align=left| Bertis McMillan
|
|
|
|align=left|
|
|-
|5
|Win
|align=center|5–0
|align=left| Mike Richardson
|
|
|
|align=left|
|
|-
|4
|Win
|align=center|4–0
|align=left| Reggie Brown
|
|
|
|align=left|
|
|-
|3
|Win
|align=center|3–0
|align=left| Larry Lane
|
|
|
|align=left|
|
|-
|2
|Win
|align=center|2–0
|align=left| Shawn Dean
|
|
|
|align=left|
|
|-
|1
|Win
|align=center|1–0
|align=left| Daniel Russell
|
|
|
|align=left|
|align=left|

References

Native American boxers
Cruiserweight boxers
Light-heavyweight boxers
Boxers from Wisconsin
1979 births
Living people
People from Keshena, Wisconsin
American male boxers
Menominee people
20th-century Native Americans
21st-century Native Americans